Gordan Vuk (born 26 May 1987 in Croatia) is a Croatian retired footballer who now works as a Commercialist at Mihha-Vision in his home country.

Career
Vuk started his senior career with NK Varaždin, where he appeared in 72 games. While with Varaždin, he registered one of the highest ball striking speeds in the 1.HNL at 140 km/h. He also appeared in the 1.HNL for NK Karlovac. He was also linked with a move to Fredrikstad in Norway in 2008, but Varaždin doubled the transfer price after his trial.

In 2012, he signed for KF Vllaznia Shkodër in the Albanian Superliga, where he made fourteen appearances and scored zero goals. After that, he played for Croatian clubs NK Čukovec '77, NK Varaždin, and NK Nedelišće before retiring.

He also played several games for the Croatian national under-20 and under-19 sides.

References

External links
 
 Rrëfehet kroati Vuk: Për inatin ndaj Vatës, ja si më përzunë nga Vllaznia 
 Ulen në stol dy të huajt Vuk dhe Moreno, ja se si ndryshon Vllaznia me Grimën 
 Vuk ima najači udarac u HNL-u 
 Gordan Vuk u prvoj postavi 
 Nema Zeca, ima Vuka 
 Gordan Vuk za prvu proljetnu pobjedu 
 Statistike hrvatskog nogometa Profile 
 Hrvatski nogometni savez Profile 
 Fieldoo Profile

1987 births
Living people
Sportspeople from Varaždin
Association football midfielders
Association football forwards
Croatian footballers
Croatia youth international footballers
NK Varaždin players
NK Međimurje players
NK Karlovac players
KF Vllaznia Shkodër players
Croatian Football League players
Kategoria Superiore players
Croatian expatriate footballers
Expatriate footballers in Albania
Croatian expatriate sportspeople in Albania